Epinotia thaiensis is a species of moth of the family Tortricidae. It is found in China (Anhui) and Thailand.

References

Moths described in 1995
Eucosmini